Lorena del Castillo (born as Lorena del Castillo Campoy on 14 July 1988 in Zapopan, Jalisco, Mexico) is a Mexican actress and model.

Biography
Lorena del Castillo before starting her career as an actress, she participated in the contest Nuestra Belleza Jalisco in the edition held in 2007 representing her hometown, Zapopan.

Lorena is a graduate of the Instituto de Ciencias de Guadalajara and the CEA de Televisa. Later she has encouraged her studies in various acting workshops, highlighting the one of the teacher Fernando Piernas.

She studied a film course for the understanding of behind-the-scenes art and various scriptwriting courses.

Her career has been developed mainly in the theater. Her first professional work was for the UNAM in the play "La tempestad" headed by Ignacio López Tarso at Juan Ruiz de Alarcón and has participated in different theatrical montages. One of the most emblematic (for being the first time the CEA won the prize) was in the play "Palomita POP, apuntes sobre la inmadurez", winning work of the "Festival Internacional de teatro de UNAM."

In telenovelas has also participated, highlighting among them her role of Ileana Sodi in Amor bravío. And her greatest opportunity in El Señor de los Cielos as Evelyn Garcia.

Her work also extends to the cinema, has made approximately fifteen independent short films, acted in the film "Entre sombras" and the film "Desde el más alla"  will be released commercially soon where she plays "Claudia".

Filmography

Film

Television

Stage

References

External links 
 
 Lorena del Castillo on CEA
Lorena del Castillo on Wikipedia in Spanish 

1988 births
21st-century Mexican actresses
Living people
People from Zapopan, Jalisco
Mexican telenovela actresses
Mexican television actresses
Actresses from Jalisco